Douglass House may refer to:

James S. and Melquides E. Douglass House, Florence, Arizona, listed on the National Register of Historic Places (NRHP) in Pinal County, Arizona
Douglass Summer House, Highland Beach, Maryland, listed on the NRHP in Anne Arundel County, Maryland
Alfred Douglass House, Brookline, Massachusetts, listed on the NRHP in Norfold County, Massachusetts
Douglass House (Houghton, Michigan), listed on the NRHP in Houghton County, Michigan
Robert L. Douglass House, Fallon, Nevada, listed on the NRHP in Churchill County, Nevada
Douglass House (Trenton, New Jersey), listed on the NRHP in Mercer County, New Jersey
John Douglass House, Kirkwood, Pennsylvania, listed on the NRHP in Lancaster County, Pennsylvania
Douglass-Reams House, Franklin, Tennessee, listed on the NRHP in Williamson County, Tennessee
Douglass-Clark House, Gallatin, Tennessee, listed on the NRHP in Sumner County, Tennessee
Samuel Douglass House, Payson, Utah, listed on the NRHP in Utah County, Utah
Douglass-Stevenson House, Fontana, Wisconsin, listed on the NRHP in Walworth County, Wisconsin

See also
Douglas House (disambiguation)
Douglass School (disambiguation)
Frederick Douglass National Historic Site